Popiel is the surname of the following people:
 Andrzej Popiel (1936–2020), Polish stage actor
 Antoni Popiel (1865–1910), Polish sculptor
 Ignatz von Popiel,  Ignacy Popiel (1863–1941), Polish (Galician) chess master
 Irena Popiel (1925–2010), Polish nun
 Jan Popiel (born 1947), Danish-Canadian ice hockey player, brother of Poul
 Karol Popiel (1887–1977), Polish politician
 Kazimierz Popiel (1894–1957), Polish mining engineer
 Maurycy Popiel (born 1990), Polish actor
 Poul Popiel (born 1943), Canadian-Danish former ice hockey player, brother of Jan
 Stefan Popiel (1896–1927), Polish footballer
 Stepan Popel,  Stefan Popiel (1909–1987), Ukrainian-Polish (Galician) chess champion
 Tadeusz Popiel (1863–1913), Polish painter
 Wincenty Teofil Popiel (1825–1912), Polish Roman Catholic priest

See also
 

Polish-language surnames